Powell Glacier is located in the Sierra Nevada Range in the U.S. state of California.

See also
List of glaciers in the United States

References

Glaciers of California
Glaciers of the Sierra Nevada (United States)
Glaciers of Inyo County, California